Iverson is a surname, an anglophonic variant of Iversen. Notable people of this surname include:

Abraham Iverson, member of the Virginia House of Burgesses
Alfred Iverson Jr. (1829–1911), American Civil War general
Alfred Iverson Sr. (1798–1873), American politician
Allen Iverson (born 1975), American basketball player
Becky Iverson (born 1967), American professional golfer
Bob Iverson (1910–1953), English professional footballer
Brent Iverson, computer programmer
Carl Iverson (born 1940), American football coach
Colton Iverson (born 1989), American basketball player for Maccabi Tel Aviv of the Israeli Basketball Premier League
David R. Iverson (born 1969), United States Air Force
Dennis Iverson (born 1981), Australian judoka
Don Iverson (born 1945), American professional golfer
Donald L. Iverson (1923–1999), American politician
Emil Iverson (1892–1960), Danish-American ice hockey coach and anthropologist
Eric G. Iverson, pen-name for author Harry Turtledove, born 1949
Ernest and Clarence Iverson, American radio personalities
Ethan Iverson (born 1973), American musician
F. Kenneth Iverson, American businessman
Jack Iverson (1915–1973), Australian cricketer
Jacob J. Iverson (1850–1923), American politician
Jana Iverson, American developmental psychologist
Jim Iverson (1930–2020), American basketball player and coach
Joanne Iverson (born 1939), American rower and coach
Johnathan Lee Iverson (born 1976), American circus entertainer
Kay Iverson, Danish-born Canadian ice hockey coach
Kenneth E. Iverson, Canadian computer scientist, inventor of APL
Kirk Vernström Iverson, American inventor, writer, producer, media executive, investor and financier
Khalil Iverson (born 1997), American professional basketball player
May Iverson, fictional heroine of a series of novels by Elizabeth Jordan
Melissa Iverson, American rower
Peter Iverson (1944–2021), Regents Professor of History (Emeritus) at Arizona State University
Philip Iverson (1965–2006), Canadian artist
Samuel G. Iverson (1859–1928), American politician
Sara Iverson, Professor of Biology at Dalhousie University
Sherrice Iverson (1989–1997), American murder victim
Stewart Iverson (born 1950), former Republican party member of the Iowa House of Representatives

See also
Iverson L. Harris (1805–1876), associate justice of the Supreme Court of Georgia

Patronymic surnames